Anaun is a stratovolcano in central Kamchatka. The volcano is located to the north-east of Uksichan volcano in the southern Sredinny Range.

See also
List of volcanoes in Russia

References

Volcanoes of the Kamchatka Peninsula
Mountains of the Kamchatka Peninsula
Stratovolcanoes of Russia
Holocene stratovolcanoes
Holocene Asia